Maurice Ducos (15 October 1904 – 30 June 1983) was a French swimmer. He competed in the men's 100 metre backstroke event at the 1924 Summer Olympics.

References

External links
 

1904 births
1983 deaths
Olympic swimmers of France
Swimmers at the 1924 Summer Olympics
Place of birth missing
French male backstroke swimmers